Broczyna  (Cashubian Bròczënô) is a village in the administrative district of Gmina Trzebielino, within Bytów County, Pomeranian Voivodeship, in northern Poland.

The village has a population of 58.

References

Broczyna